Catawba County Courthouse is a historic courthouse building located at Newton, Catawba County, North Carolina. It was built in 1924, and is a two-story,  Renaissance Revival style granite veneered structure. It consists of a two-story main block flanked by slightly recessed two-story wings.

It was listed on the National Register of Historic Places in 1979. It is located in the Newton Downtown Historic District.

Now home to the Catawba County Museum of History, the Courthouse was designed by Willard G. Rogers of Charlotte and built by J. J. Stout for $250,000.

References

County courthouses in North Carolina
Courthouses on the National Register of Historic Places in North Carolina
Government buildings completed in 1924
Renaissance Revival architecture in North Carolina
Buildings and structures in Catawba County, North Carolina
National Register of Historic Places in Catawba County, North Carolina
Historic district contributing properties in North Carolina